Suresh Kumar Shetkar (born 8 August 1960) is an Indian politician and a member of the 15th Lok Sabha. He is elected as the Senior Vice President of Telangana Pradesh Congress Committee in 2021 He belongs to the Indian National Congress political party and he represented Zahirabad constituency in Telangana. Suresh Shetkar was the Member of legislative assembly from Narayankhed constituency from 2004 to 2009.

Early life
Suresh Shetkar was born in Naranyankhed, Medak to Shivrao Shetkar, a freedom fighter and three-time MLA and Chandramma. He did his B.Sc. (Agriculture) Educated at Marathwada Agricultural University Parbhani, Maharashtra.

Career
His father gave Congress party ticket to P. Kista Reddy who was follower of Shivrao Shetkar according to an agreement who apparently deceived before by going independent and later was first time elected as An MLA from Narayankhed Constituency in 2004. Suresh Shetkar was elected to Zahirabad lok sabha as MP constituency in 2009.

Personal life
Suresh Shetkar is 2nd born in the family and is married to Uma and has a son and has two daughter.
He has a sister and 3 brothers.

References

External links
 Official profile

Living people
1960 births
India MPs 2009–2014
People from Medak district
Indian National Congress politicians from Andhra Pradesh
Lok Sabha members from Andhra Pradesh